The Texian Militia was the militia forces of Texian colonists in the Mexican state of Coahuila y Tejas from 1823 to 1835 and the inaugurate force of the Texas Military. It was established by Stephen F. Austin on August 5, 1823 for defense of the Old Three Hundred colonists against the Karankawa, Comanche, and Cherokee tribes; among others. Its most notable unit, the Texas Rangers, remained in continuous service of Texas Military Forces until 1935.

The Texian Militia sparked the Texas Revolution at the Battle of Velasco and became legendary at the Battle of Gonzales (the "Lexington of Texas") which marked its transition to the Texian Army and Texian Navy. Their legend continued at the Battle of the Alamo as the only relief force to answer the To the People of Texas & All Americans in the World letter. The Texian Militia comprised 22% of the Texian Army service members who fought until the Battle of San Jacinto, helping the Texian Government win independence from the Centralist Republic of Mexico on May 14, 1836 at the Treaties of Velasco.

Authority 

The Texian Militia was first authorized on February 18, 1823 by Agustín de Iturbide of the First Mexican Empire who ordered the Empresario Stephen F. Austin to "organize the colonists into a body of militia to preserve tranquility." On August 5, 1823 Austin officially established the Texian Militia:"Since the commencement of this Colony no labor or expense has been spared on my part towards its organization, benefit and security—And I shall always be ready and willing to risk my health, my property or my life for the common advantage of those who have embarked with me in this enterprise. As proof of the reality of this declaration I have determined to augment at my own private expense the company of men which was raised by order of the late Governor José Félix Trespalacios for the defense of the Colony against hostile Indians. I therefore by these presents give public notice that I will employ ten men in addition to those employed by the Government to act as rangers for the common defense. The said ten men will form a part of Lieut. Moses Morrison’s Company and the whole will be subject to my orders. The wages I will give the said ten men is fifteen Dollars a month payable in property, they finding [it] themselves. Those who wish to be employed will apply without delay. Stephen F. Austin 5 August 1823."

Stephen F. Austin

5 August 1823
In 1823, the First Mexican Empire transitioned to the Provisional Government of Mexico which established the First Mexican Republic in 1824. In 1828, the Coahuila y Tejas Legislature order colonists to "form a militia to defend themselves".

Units 

Bexar
 Goliad
 Rangers
Gonzales Ranging Company
 San Felipe

Notable engagements

Legacy 

Since 1823, the Texian Militia has undergone many re-designations and reorganizations in the Texas Military Forces:

 Texian Militia, 1823–1835 (Colonist era), 1835–1836 (Texas Revolution)
 Texas Militia, 1836–1845 (Republic era), 1845–1861 (Frontier era)
 Texas Home Guard/State Troops, 1861–65 (American Civil War)
 Texas Volunteer Guard, 1871–1904 (Reconstruction era)

Following the Militia Act of 1903, the Texas Militia was divided into separate forces:

 The Texas Army National Guard and Texas Air National Guard, subject to Title 32 and Title 10 of the United States Code which legally empowers the United States government to mobilize it when more resources are needed than available in the United States Armed Forces for war, national emergency, or national security.
 The Texas State Guard, only subject to Title 32 of the United States Code which legally empowers individual states to maintain military forces.

Since 1903, the Texas National Guard designation has remained the same while the Texas State Guard has been designated as the:

 Texas Reserve Militia, 1905–1913
 Texas Home Guard, 1914–1918 (World War I)
 Texas Reserve Militia, 1919–1940
 Texas Defense/State Guard, 1941–45 (World War II)
 Texas State Guard Reserve Corps, 1945–1965
Texas State Guard, 1965–present

See also 

Immortal 32
Texas Military Forces
 Texas Military Department
 List of conflicts involving the Texas Military
 Awards and decorations of the Texas Military

References 

Texas Military Forces
Texas Revolution
Texas Military Department